This is a list of the 12 departments of the Republic of the Congo by Human Development Index as of 2021.

See also 

 List of countries by Human Development Index

References 

Congo, Republic of
Congo
Human Development Index
Human Development Index